The 1910–11 Cornell Big Red men's ice hockey season was the 10th season of play for the program.

Season
Despite not having ice to practice on early in their season the team was able to coalesce around a core of returning players. Returning to school for his senior season was Jefferson Vincent who had to earn his way back onto the team through several cuts and a demotion to the second squad. The potent combination of Vincent and Magner turned out to be instrumental in Cornell's success for the year.

The Big Red opened with a three-game series against Yale for the second consecutive year, this time playing in Chicago. Though the games were close Cornell was able to win each match. Magner and Crassweller played particularly well while Vincent recorded a hat-trick in the second game. On their way back east Cornell stopped in Cleveland for a two-game series against local colleges, winning both handily. Vincent notched his second 3-goal game against Western Reserve but it was Magner who starred with 5 scores to his credit.

Cornell opened its conference slate against defending champion Princeton and downed the Tigers with Magner and Vincent each providing 2 goals. After downing Yale for the fourth time that season Cornell entered the pivotal match against Harvard with a chance at their first championship. Both teams had shown themselves to be at the top of the collegiate hockey world with a combined 12–1 record and the winner was largely expected to claim the championship that season. The two teams fought a mostly even match with regulation ending in a 2–2 draw, but in the overtime Jefferson Vincent provided Cornell with perhaps its biggest single moment when he scored the game-winning goal.

While Cornell had two more game to play, they were against the comparatively weaker Columbia and Dartmouth clubs. Both Magner and Vincent again scored twice in the team's shutout of Columbia while a 5–1 win over Dartmouth sealed Cornell's first IHA championship.

The planets did seem to align for Cornell in 1911 as their 10 wins was the highest total the team would reach for over 50 years (they wouldn't even play 10 games in a single season again until 1940). None of their games were played at home, owing to the extended road trip and the poor quality of ice on Beebe Lake, but having star forward Jefferson Vincent on the team a year after he should have already graduated was an offensive boon for the Big Red.

Roster

Standings

Schedule and Results

|-
!colspan=12 style=";" | Regular Season

References

Cornell Big Red men's ice hockey seasons
Cornell
Cornell
Cornell
Cornell